Axel Geller (born 1 April 1999) is an Argentine former tennis player. Geller was ranked as high as world No. 539 in singles, which he achieved in August 2019, by the Association of Tennis Professionals (ATP), and had claimed six singles and doubles titles on the International Tennis Federation (ITF)'s World Tennis Tour between 2018 and 2019. 

In 2017, he became the No. 1-ranked junior after winning the doubles title at Wimbledon and placing runner-up in both singles finals at Wimbledon and the US Open. Geller later attended Stanford University, where he played for the men's tennis team. Following his graduation from Stanford in 2022, he announced his retirement from tennis in order to pursue a career in finance.

ATP Challenger and ITF Futures finals

Singles: 3 (3–0)

Doubles: 3 (3–0)

Junior Grand Slam finals

Singles: 2 (2 finals)

Doubles: 1 (1 title)

References

External links
 
 

1999 births
Living people
Stanford Cardinal men's tennis players
Argentine male tennis players
Tennis players from Buenos Aires
Wimbledon junior champions
Grand Slam (tennis) champions in boys' doubles
21st-century Argentine people